Donald Elliott "Doc" Hines (November 14, 1933 – June 18, 2019) was an American family physician in Bunkie in Avoyelles Parish, Louisiana, who was from 1993 to 2008 a member of the Louisiana State Senate for District 28.  In his last term from 2004 to 2008, he was the Senate President under his political ally, Democratic former Governor Kathleen Babineaux Blanco.

Biography 
Hines completed his undergraduate studies from the University of Louisiana at Lafayette and obtained his M.D. from the Louisiana State University Health Sciences Center in New Orleans. He served as a second lieutenant in the United States Navy from 1959 to 1963. Near the end of his naval service Hines received the Commendation Medal in 1963 for bravely jumping out of a helicopter into the swamps south of New Iberia to rescue his fellow military men who needed medical attention following an aircraft crash.

He began his medical practice in 1966. He is a member of the Louisiana and the Avoyelles Parish medical societies. Hines was a member of the Avoyelles Parish School Board from 1972 until his election to the state Senate. From 1984 to 1990, Hines was the director of the  Louisiana Wildlife and Fisheries Commission and served at the end of his tenure there as the commission chairman. In that capacity, he work to preserve wildlife and public land. As state senator, he was involved in Hurricane Katrina recovery and secured funding to transform the Haas Auditorium in Bunkie into a  hurricane evacuation and civic center.

Hines won a special election on January 16, 1993, to succeed Senator John Saunders, who resigned after seventeen years in the office. In addition to his own Avoyelles Parish, District 28 included in 1993 all or parts of the following: Allen, Calcasieu, Evangeline, Jeff Davis, and St. Landry parishes. Hines polled 15,314 votes (58 percent) to 11,094 (42 percent) for his intraparty opponent, I. Jackson Burson, Jr, a lawyer from Eunice.

Hines was elected to his first full term in 1995 with opposition from one other Democrat. From 1996 to 2000, a portion of Avoyelles Parish was also represented in the state Senate by a second physician and a former professional football player, Republican Tommy Casanova of Crowley in Acadia Parish. Hines won his third and fourth terms without opposition in 1999 and 2003.

In 2006, HInes was inducted into the Louisiana Political Museum and Hall of Fame in Winnfield. In its announcement of his induction, the Hall of Fame called his a "country doctor ... who became one of the Senate’s most articulate spokesmen for the needs of the working class and poor people." Hines chaired the task force that created the Louisiana Children's Health Insurance Program. He also authored the  Rural Hospital Preservation Act and the SeniorRX Prescription Program. He helped to establish the Gene Therapy Research Initiative.

Term-limited in the Senate, Hines was succeeded by his fellow Democrat Eric LaFleur of Ville Platte in Evangeline Parish. LaFleur won the Senate seat on November 17, 2007, when he defeated in a runoff contest, Donald Newton of Bunkie, a grandson of Donald Hines.

Hines died at the age of 85 on June 18, 2019.

References

 

 

1933 births
2019 deaths
Democratic Party Louisiana state senators
Louisiana State University alumni
People from Bunkie, Louisiana
Physicians from Louisiana
University of Louisiana at Lafayette alumni
School board members in Louisiana
United States Navy officers
Military personnel from Louisiana
Baptists from Louisiana
20th-century American physicians
20th-century Baptists